Weezer (commonly known as the Blue Album) is the debut studio album by American rock band Weezer, released on May 10, 1994, by DGC Records. It was produced by Ric Ocasek.

Weezer formed in Los Angeles in 1992, and initially struggled to engage audiences, who were more interested in grunge. In November, they recorded a demo, The Kitchen Tape, which brought them to the attention of DGC owner Geffen Records. Urged to choose a producer instead of self-producing, Weezer selected Ocasek for his work with the Cars. Most of the album was recorded at Electric Lady Studios in New York City between August and September 1993. The group treated the guitars and bass as a single, 10-string instrument, playing in unison. Guitarist Jason Cropper was fired during recording, as the band felt he was threatening their chemistry; he was replaced by Brian Bell.

Weezer was supported by the singles "Undone – The Sweater Song", "Buddy Holly", and "Say It Ain't So", whose music videos became MTV hits. It reached number sixteen on the US Billboard 200, and was certified triple platinum in 1995. It remains Weezer's best-selling album, having sold at least 3.3 million copies in the U.S. and over 15 million copies worldwide by 2009. It received critical acclaim, and in 2020 Rolling Stone ranked it number 294 on its updated list of The 500 Greatest Albums of All Time.

Background 
Weezer was formed on February 14, 1992, in Los Angeles by singer and guitarist Rivers Cuomo, drummer Patrick Wilson, bassist Matt Sharp, and guitarist Jason Cropper. Although they performed future hits including "Undone – The Sweater Song" and "Say It Ain't So", Cuomo said they struggled to engage audiences, who wanted to see grunge bands instead.

In an effort to create buzz around Los Angeles, Weezer recorded a demo, The Kitchen Tape. This attracted attention from major-label A&R reps looking for alternative rock bands to perform on the same bill as That Dog. Weezer were signed to DGC Records on June 26, 1993, by Todd Sullivan, an A&R rep from Geffen Records.

Recording 
While preparing for the studio sessions, Weezer focused on their vocal interplay by practicing barbershop quartet-style songs, which helped Cuomo and Sharp feel more comfortable collaborating during rehearsals. Sharp, who had never sung before joining Weezer, developed his falsetto: "I had to sing an octave higher than Rivers. After a lot of practice, I started to get it down."

Weezer rehearsed 15 songs in New York in preparation for the Electric Lady Studios recording sessions. Four songs from this rehearsal would not be attempted for the album: "I Swear It's True", "Getting Up and Leaving" (which would both later appear on the deluxe edition of the band's second album Pinkerton), and a reprise version of "In the Garage". Another song, "Mykel and Carli", an ode to two women who ran the Weezer fanclub, was recorded. Weezer later recorded another version of "Mykel and Carli" as a B-side for the single "Undone – The Sweater Song", with close friend of Cuomo, actor and songwriter Karl Koch, which is also included on the album's deluxe edition.

Weezer considered self-producing the album, but were pressured by Geffen to choose a producer. They decided on Ric Ocasek, who had played with the Cars. Ocasek convinced the band to switch their guitar pickups from the neck to the bridge, resulting in a brighter sound. Sharp and Cuomo imposed several rules on recording, banning reverb and insisting on all downstrokes on guitar. According to engineer Chris Shaw, the "overriding concept" was to treat the guitars and bass as a single, 10-string instrument, playing in unison. Weezer insisted that the guitars were mixed as loudly as those in Radiohead's 1992 song "Creep", burying some vocals.

During the recording, Cropper learned that his girlfriend was pregnant and began acting erratically. Weezer collaborator Karl Koch said: "He wasn't handling it well ... he always said he was fine, and then 20 minutes later he'd be up on the roof of Electric Lady screaming or something." According to Cropper, Cuomo told him he could not allow him to jeopardize the work and asked him to leave. In 2014, Cropper said Cuomo had made the right decision. He was replaced by Brian Bell. While Bell's vocals appear on some tracks, Cuomo re-recorded all of Cropper's guitar parts. Ocasek recalled: "After [the album] was completely recorded, Rivers came in and said, 'I’m firing the guitar player, and I’m going to do all his guitar parts over.' I said, 'You can’t do that!' But he did. In one take." Bell is still credited for playing guitar in the liner notes. Cropper received a credit on "My Name Is Jonas" for writing the intro.

Music 

The album is described as alternative rock, power pop, pop punk, emo, pop rock, and geek rock.

Artwork 
The album artwork, photographed by American glamour photographer Peter Gowland, features Wilson, Cuomo, Sharp, and Bell standing in front of a plain, blue background. Adobe Photoshop was used to digitally alter the cover. Cuomo stated that, while the band liked the photo, Sharp was not happy with the way his head looked. The Geffen Art Director used Photoshop to swap out the head with one from another shot. The image was used prominently in the advertising of the album. The cover received many comparisons to that of the Feelies' album Crazy Rhythms.

On some vinyl pressings of the album, the cover does not crop off their feet. On the Deluxe Edition case the feet are presented on the back cover, and the band sold an official T-shirt with a shot of the band's feet after the deluxe edition release.

Inside the album booklet, Cuomo pays tribute to his past metal influences with a photo taken in the group's garage on Amherst (this same garage would be featured in the "Say It Ain't So" music video). A poster of Judas Priest's album British Steel is featured on the left side of the photo, while on the right a Quiet Riot concert poster is displayed. The Deluxe Edition features additional photographs of the band and hand-written lyrics for each song.

Promotion 
The first single "Undone – The Sweater Song" was described by Cuomo as "the feeling you get when the train stops and the little guy comes knockin' on your door. It was supposed to be a sad song, but everyone thinks it's hilarious." The video marks one of the early directorial efforts of Spike Jonze, whose pitch was simply "A blue stage, a steadicam, a pack of wild dogs." The video became an instant hit on MTV. The final single, "Say It Ain't So", was inspired by Cuomo believing his parents split up when he was four because he thought his father was an alcoholic. The music video, which was directed by Sophie Muller, was less successful than the previous Spike Jonze-directed video. It featured the band performing in the garage of their former house, and the bandmates playing hacky sack in the backyard.

Release 
The Blue Album was released on May 10, 1994. It was certified gold by the Recording Industry Association of America (RIAA) just under seven months later on December 1, 1994, and was certified platinum by the RIAA on January 13, 1995. The Blue Album was certified 2× platinum by the RIAA on August 8, 1995. The album was certified 3× platinum by the RIAA on November 13, 1998. The album peaked at No. 16 on the Billboard 200. As a single, "Undone – The Sweater Song" peaked at No. 35 on the UK Top 40, and "Buddy Holly" and "Say It Ain't So" peaked at No. 12 and No. 37 on the UK Top 40 respectively. In the U.S., "Buddy Holly" peaked at No. 17 on the Billboard Hot 100 Airplay chart.

A "deluxe edition" of the album was released on March 23, 2004, including the original album and a second disc, Dusty Gems and Raw Nuggets, containing B-sides and rarities. As of December 2007, the "deluxe edition" had sold 86,000 copies. The second disc is also available separately.

Critical reception 

The Blue Album received critical acclaim. Rolling Stone praised the album in their year-end review, saying "Weezer's Rivers Cuomo is great at sketching vignettes (the Dungeons and Dragons games and Kiss posters that inspire the hapless daydreamer of 'In the Garage'), and with sweet inspiration like the waltz tempo of 'My Name Is Jonas' and the self-deprecating humor of lines like "I look just like Buddy Holly / And you're Mary Tyler Moore", his songs easily ingratiate." Robert Christgau of The Village Voice was less complimentary and awarded the album a "neither" rating. The "Buddy Holly" video won four awards at the 1995 MTV Video Music Awards, including prizes for Breakthrough Video and Best Alternative Video. In 2020, Rolling Stone ranked it number 294 on its updated list of The 500 Greatest Albums of All Time.

Legacy 
The Blue Album has become one of the most highly regarded albums of the 1990s, as well as of all time, appearing on many "Best-of" lists. In 2020, Rolling Stone ranked the album number 294 on their list of the 500 Greatest Albums of All Time. It was previously ranked at 297 in 2003, and 299 in 2012.  In 2002, the readers of Rolling Stone ranked the album the 21st greatest of all time. Blender named the Blue Album among the "500 CDs You Must Own", calling the album "Absolute geek-rock, out and proud." Non-U.S. publications have acclaimed the album as well: New Zealand's The Movement placed it at number 39 on a list of "The 101 Best Albums of the 90s", and Visions of Germany ranked it number 32 on a list of "The Most Important Albums of the 90s." In November 2011, the Blue Album was ranked number three on Guitar World magazine's top ten list of guitar albums of 1994, with Bad Religion's Stranger than Fiction and The Offspring's Smash in first and second place respectively. The album also peaked at number 25 on Guitar Worlds "Superunknown: 50 Iconic Albums That Defined 1994" list.

Reviews of the album when its deluxe edition was released have reflected its rise in stature continuing to be positive. In 2004, PopMatters gave the album a very positive review, saying "I'd go so far to declare the 'Blue Album' one of the greatest records of the last 20 years." And Rolling Stone reiterated their original positive review by further describing it as "big, vibrant pop-rock that would inspire thousands of emo kids". Blogcritics gave the album 10/10 and described it as "one of the most important debut albums of the last ten years".

In naming Weezer the 26th best album of the 1990s, Pitchfork summed up the album's critical recognition:

NME credited the album as a formative influence on melodic emo. AllMusic critic Stephen Thomas Erlewine gave the album 5/5, writing: "Although the group wears its influences on its sleeve, Weezer pulls it together in a strikingly original fashion, thanks to Cuomo's urgent melodicism, a fondness for heavy, heavy guitars, a sly sense of humor, and damaged vulnerability, all driven home at a maximum volume."

 Accolades 
Since its release, the Blue Album has featured heavily in various "must have" lists compiled by the music media. Some of the more prominent of these lists to feature the Blue Album are shown below; this information is adapted from Acclaimed Music.

( * ) designates lists which are unordered.

 Track listing 

Original release

Deluxe Edition

 Personnel Weezer Rivers Cuomo – lead vocals, lead and rhythm guitar, keyboards, harmonica
 Patrick Wilson – drums
 Brian Bell – rhythm guitar (credit only), backing vocals
 Matt Sharp – bass, backing vocalsAdditional musicians Mykel Allan – spoken intermission on "Undone – The Sweater Song"
 Karl Koch – dialogue, piano outro on "Undone – The Sweater Song"Production Ric Ocasek – producer
 Chris Shaw – engineer
 Hal Belknap – assistant engineer
David Heglmeier - assistant engineer
Daniel Smith - assistant engineer
Michael Golob - art direction
 Peter Gowland, Peter Orth — photographer
 Karl Koch — designer
 Todd Sullivan — A&R
 George Marino — mastering

 Charts 

 Weekly 

 Year-end 

 Singles 

Certifications

 References NotesBibliography'

External links 

 Weezer at YouTube (streamed copy where licensed)
 
 Lyrics for Weezer – The Blue Album

 Weezer on Spotify

Weezer albums
1994 debut albums
Geffen Records albums
Albums produced by Ric Ocasek
Albums recorded at Electric Lady Studios